Maximiliano de la Luz Borges y del Junco (May 29, 1890 in Jaruco, Cuba - June 9, 1963, Arlington, VA) was a well-known Cuban architect and Minister of Public Works during the presidency of  Dr. Federico Laredo Brú of Cuba.

He graduated as an engineer in 1916 and as an architect (in 1917).  His first company was “Construcciones Max Borges” later renamed “Max Borges e Hijos”.  He was married first to Enriqueta Recio y Heymann in 1917 and they had three sons, Alberto (Plastic Surgeon...M.D., F.A.C.S., F.I.C.S.) and Enrique and Max Borges Recio both architects who joined their father in his firm). He later married Josefina Seiglie (in 1937) and they had Josefina and Ana Maria Borges y Seiglie.

References
 Los Propietarios de Cuba 1958, Guillermo Jimenez Soler (Havana, Cuba: Editorial de Ciencias Sociales, 2007)
 The Havana Guide - Modern Architecture 1925-1965, Eduardo Luis Rodriguez (New York: Princeton Architectural Press, 2000) 
 La Habana, Guia de Arquitectura, Maria Elena Zequeira & Eduardo Luis Rodriguez Fernandez, editors (Havana, Cuba: Ciudad de La Habana Provincial de Planificacion Fisica y Arquitectura, 1998) 
 Anuario Social de La Habana 1939, Julio de Cespedes & Miguel Baguer, editors (Havana, Cuba: Luz-Hilo, S.A., 1939)
 Directorio Social de la Habana 1948, Maria R. de Fontanills & Eduardo Fontanills Jr., editors (Havana, Cuba: P. Fernandez y Cia., S. en C., 1948)
 Libro de Oro de la Sociedad Habanera 1949, Joaquin de Posada, Eduardo Cidre & Pablo Alvarez de Canas, editors (Havana, Cuba: Editorial Lex, 1949)
 Libro de Oro de la Sociedad Habanera 1950, Joaquin de Posada, Eduardo Cidre & Pablo Alvarez de Canas, editors (Havana, Cuba: Editorial Lex, 1950)
 Libro de Oro de la Sociedad Habanera 1953, Joaquin de Posada & Pablo Alvarez de Canas, editors (Havana, Cuba: Editorial Lex, 1953)
 Registro Social de la Habana 1955, Julio de Cespedes, editor (Havana, Cuba: Molina y Cia., S.A., 1955)
 Registro Social de la Habana 1958, Julio de Cespedes, editor (Havana, Cuba: Molina y Cia., S.A., 1958)

1890 births
1963 deaths
People from Jaruco
Cuban architects
Cuban emigrants to the United States